Gerhard Schmidt may refer to:
 Gerhard Schmidt (biochemist) (1901–1981), biochemist
 Gerhard Schmidt (crystallographer) (1919–1971), organic chemist and chemical crystallographer
 Gerhard Carl Schmidt (1865–1949), German chemist
 Gerhard Schmidt (art historian) (1924–2010), professor of the history of art